The 51st Edition Vuelta a España (Tour of Spain), a long-distance bicycle stage race and one of the three Grand Tours, was held from 7 September to 29 September 1996. This was the only time in cycling history that riders from Switzerland swept the Podium in a Grand Tour.

Five-time Tour de France winner Miguel Indurain started his home tour for the first time since finishing second in 1991, having just recently been dislodged at the Tour by Bjarne Riis. He was initially reluctant to start, but convinced by his team to do so after a strong performance during the time trial at the Olympic Games in Atlanta. However, Indurain would eventually abandon the race, which would prove to be the last of his career, on stage 13 while lying in third place overall, having been dropped by the rest of the race favourites on the first-category climb of the Fito pass.

Teams and riders

Route

General classification

References

External links
La Vuelta (Official site in Spanish, English, and French)

 
1996 in road cycling
1996
1996 in Spanish sport
September 1996 sports events in Europe